Archibald Kyle (13 July 1883 – 21 July 1957) was a Scottish football player who played for Rangers, Blackburn Rovers and Hamilton Academical.

Career
Kyle joined Rangers from Parkhead in 1904. He was one of a number of Roman Catholic players at the club during the early 1900s. Kyle made 110 League and Scottish Cup appearances for the club and scored 52 goals during his four-season spell. He was unable to claim any major honours in an era when rivals Celtic were dominant, the nearest being a runners-up medal from the 1904–05 Scottish Cup.

He left Rangers 1908 to move to England with Blackburn Rovers and later Bradford Park Avenue before a brief stint in Ireland at Linfield. Kyle returned to Scotland and played with Clyde, St Mirren and Hamilton Academical.

Personal life 
Kyle married Letitia Hargreaves in 1905 and raised his family in Bridgeton, Glasgow. His grandson from daughter Mary "Catherine" Miller née Kyle is singer-songwriter Frankie Miller.

In 1924, he and John Browning, a former Celtic player, were found guilty of attempting to bribe Bo'ness player Peter Brown in a public house in Glasgow's Dundas Street: both men were sentenced to 60 days' hard labour.

References

External links
Details of Rangers career

1883 births
1957 deaths
Scottish footballers
Footballers from Glasgow
Blackburn Rovers F.C. players
Bradford (Park Avenue) A.F.C. players
Rangers F.C. players
Linfield F.C. players
Clyde F.C. players
St Mirren F.C. players
Parkhead F.C. players
Scottish Junior Football Association players
Hamilton Academical F.C. players
Association football forwards
Scottish Football League players
English Football League players
Scottish Roman Catholics
Scottish Football League representative players
Bo'ness F.C. players
People convicted of bribery
20th-century Scottish criminals
Sportspeople convicted of crimes
Scotland junior international footballers